RAF West Freugh is a former Royal Air Force station located in Wigtownshire,  south east of Stranraer, Dumfries and Galloway, Scotland.

It has always been an armaments training school, either for handling or deployment of ordnance.

The site is now known as MOD West Freugh and is operated by defence contractor QinetiQ, on behalf of the Ministry of Defence.

History
During the First World War the site was a base for naval airships, known as RNAS Luce Bay. The base was provided with one huge airship hangar.

RAF West Freugh opened in 1937 as an armament training camp. During the Second World War, it expanded to include training facilities for observers, navigators, and bomb aimers; and served as a base for the Bombing Trials Unit. The known history of units known at West Freugh is:
22 October 1939 – 10 Service Flying Training School formed. Moved November
4 November 1939 – 4 Air Observer School formed
11 January 1940 – re-designated 4 Bombing & Gunnery School
14 June 1941 – 4 Air Observer School reformed
11 June 1943 – re-designated 4 Observer Advanced Flying Unit
21 June 1945 – 4 Observer Advanced Flying Unit disbanded
April 1957 – RAF West Freugh incident
2001 – Airfield closed, all RAF operations cease
2001 – operations taken over by QinetiQ
In addition to the units listed above (and with manpower possibly drawn from some of them) a Mountain Rescue Team was based at West Freugh from 1945 to 1956. After 1956 the MRT at RAF Leuchars assumed responsibility for the area covered by West Freugh. The team was part of the RAF's Mountain Rescue Service.

The following units were also here at some point:
Squadrons

Units

Satellite Earth Station 
A satellite earth station is located at West Freugh and was established to receive and distribute data from the European Space Agency's ERS radar satellites. In September 2005 it was announced that the earth station at West Freugh was the first outside Canada to be certified to provide imagery from the Canadian RADARSAT commercial satellite.

Present day
In 1987, Exercise Purple Warrior forces utilised West Freugh.

West Freugh, operated by QinetiQ since 2001, is used as a test range for bombs and Air-to-Ground missiles. Its ranges extend over Luce Bay, and an area of land at Torrs Warren.

In 1988 and 1990 its ranges were used to test Phalanx CIWS weapons system with depleted uranium rounds. A subsequent radiological survey of beach, sand and seawater by staff from the Atomic Weapons Establishment concluded that there was no detectable contamination.

The airfield is no longer licensed or active, however it is available for military exercises. West Freugh has also been used on several occasions for exercises by 16 Air Assault Brigade under the Exercise Joint Warrior banner.

See also 
 List of former Royal Air Force stations

References

Citations

Bibliography

External links
MOD West Freugh – LPTA

Airports established in 1936
Bombing ranges
Buildings and structures in Dumfries and Galloway
Royal Air Force stations in Scotland
Royal Air Force stations of World War II in the United Kingdom